Douglas S. Steinbrech, MD, FACS, (born 1965) is a plastic and reconstructive surgeon affiliated with Lenox Hill Hospital, the NYU Langone Medical Center in New York City and the New York Eye and Ear Infirmary of Mount Sinai and NYU Langone Medical Center. He currently practices with Dr. Philip J. Miller at Gotham Plastic Surgery in New York City and specializes in plastic surgery

Education and training
Steinbrech received a Bachelor of Science degree in biology from the University of Iowa College of Liberal Arts and Sciences in 1988. Then, he attended medical school at the University of Iowa Carver College of Medicine where he graduated in 1994.

Career
Steinbrech is a Fellow of the American College of Surgeons since 2008. He is currently a clinical instructor at the New York University School of Medicine, practices at Gotham Plastic Surgery, and is a member of several medical societies including the American Society for Aesthetic Plastic Surgery, the American Society of Plastic Surgeons and the American Medical Association.

Selected publications

Gilbert SR, Steinbrech DS, Landas SK, and Hunninghake GW. Amounts of Angiotensin Converting enzyme mRNA reflect the burden of granulomas in granulomatous lung disease. American Review of Respiratory Disease, 148: 483-6 1993.
Steinbrech DS et al. Fibroblast response to hypoxia: The relationship between angiogenesis and matrix regulation. Journal of Surgical Research, 84(2):127-33, 1999

References

External links

Men's Plastic Surgery Manhattan 
Male Plastic Surgery LA

1965 births
Living people
American plastic surgeons
University of Iowa alumni
New York University Grossman School of Medicine faculty
Fellows of the American College of Surgeons